Ziemeļu priekšpilsēta (North suburbs) is a modern neighborhood in Liepāja, Latvia.  Located south from Karosta next to Jaunliepāja. In the recent years there has been a high crime rate and it is considered as an unsafe neighborhood.

References

Neighbourhoods in Liepāja